John Francis Burnes (July 12, 1883 – June 14, 1918) was an officer in the United States Marine Corps during World War I and the first Marine Mustang.

Biography
He was born in Binghamton, New York, as Martin J. Maher, son of Martin C. Maher and Bridget Kelley. He grew up in Corning, New York, and in 1900 US Census is listed as working as an iron moulder in that city. He enlisted in the Marine Corps in June 1904 as John Francis Burnes.

His overseas stations include Panama (1904, 1913), Santo Domingo (1905), Cuba (1906–1909),the Philippine Islands (1909–1910, 18 Jul 1913 – 30 Sep 1913), Nicaragua (5 Sep 1912 – 16 Jan 1913), Peking (1914), and France (1918). He was promoted to 1st sergeant in May 1907 and to sergeant major on 28 Sep 1916.

On December 9, 1916, in a letter signed (by direction) by John A. LeJeune, Burnes was "designated to take the examination for appointment as Marine Gunner (General Duties)". Burnes passed those examinations with a final average of 96.46%, and on 24 March 1917, Secretary of the Navy Josephus Daniels signed off on the appointment, making Burnes a Marine Mustang. Burnes was discharged from his enlistment so that he could accept the appointment as Marine Gunner (a rank equivalent to Chief Warrant Officer).

The US entered WW1 in April 1917, and military promotions were accelerated. Burnes was commissioned as a 1stLt (temporary) on 2 June 1917 and then as a Captain (temporary) on 3 June 1917.

He served with the 74th Company in the 6th Regiment of the USMC in France, where his gallant service in battle was recognized posthumously by the Distinguished Service Cross. "In the attack on the Bois de Belleau June 12, 1918 he was badly wounded but completed disposition of his platoon under violent fire. The injuries which he sustained in the performance of this self-sacrificing duty later caused his death." He was also awarded the Navy Cross and a Silver Star citation.

His remains were repatriated in July 1921, and he is buried in Arlington National Cemetery (Section Sou., Lot 4472 WH).

Awards and decorations

Navy Cross

Citation:
The President of the United States of America takes pride in presenting the Navy Cross (Posthumously) to Captain John F. Burnes (MCSN: 0-2061), United States Marine Corps, for extraordinary heroism while serving with the Sixth Regiment (Marines), 2d Division, A.E.F. in action in the attack on Bois-de-Belleau, France, 12 June 1918. Captain Burnes was badly wounded, but completed the disposition of his platoon under violent fire. The injuries which he sustained in the performance of this self-sacrificing duty later caused his death.

Distinguished Service Cross

Citation:
The President of the United States of America, authorized by Act of Congress, July 9, 1918, takes pride in presenting the Distinguished Service Cross (Posthumously) to Captain John F. Burnes (MCSN: 0-2061), United States Marine Corps, for extraordinary heroism while serving with the Sixth Regiment (Marines), 2d Division, A.E.F., in action in the attack on Bois-de-Belleau, France, 12 June 1918. Captain Burnes was badly wounded, but completed the disposition of his platoon under violent fire. The injuries which he sustained in the performance of this self-sacrificing duty later caused his death.

Comendations
Capt Burnes' awards include:

Namesake
The destroyer  was named for him.

See also

References

US Marine Corps Distinguished Service Cross Recipients - WWI, Home of Heroes.com. (MS Word document)

1883 births
1918 deaths
People from Binghamton, New York
People from Corning, New York
United States Marine Corps officers
Recipients of the Distinguished Service Cross (United States)
American military personnel killed in World War I
United States Marine Corps personnel of World War I
Military personnel from New York (state)